Daegu Polytechnic College is a vocational training institution serving Daegu metropolitan city, the third-largest city in South Korea. The current president is Lee Chang-u (이창우).   About 40 instructors are employed.

Academics

The college comprises departments of Computer Aided Machinery, Computer Aided Design, Electrical Instrumentation, Electronics, Materials, Equipment Manufacturing Automation, Mechatronics, Nursing, Ophthalmology, Hotel and Tourism, and Environmental Chemistry.

Notable people
Hwang Chi-yeul, singer

See also
Education in South Korea

External links
Official school website, in Korean

Vocational education in South Korea
Universities and colleges in Daegu
Korea Polytechnics